Judges 21 is the twenty-first (and final) chapter of the Book of Judges in the Old Testament or the Hebrew Bible. According to Jewish tradition the book was attributed to the prophet Samuel, but modern scholars view it as part of the Deuteronomistic History, which spans in the books of Deuteronomy to 2 Kings, attributed to nationalistic and devotedly Yahwistic writers during the time of the reformer Judean king Josiah in the 7th century BCE. This chapter records the war between the tribe of Benjamin and the other eleven tribes of Israel, belonging to a section comprising Judges 17 to 21.

Text
This chapter was originally written in the Hebrew language. It is divided into 25 verses.

Textual witnesses

Some early manuscripts containing the text of this chapter in Hebrew are of the Masoretic Text tradition, which includes the Codex Cairensis (895), Aleppo Codex (10th century), and Codex Leningradensis (1008). Fragments containing parts of this chapter in Hebrew were found among the Dead Sea Scrolls including 4Q50 (4QJudg; 30 BCE–68 CE) with extant verses 12–25.

Extant ancient manuscripts of a translation into Koine Greek known as the Septuagint (originally was made in the last few centuries BCE) include Codex Vaticanus (B; B; 4th century) and Codex Alexandrinus (A; A; 5th century).

Analysis

Double Introduction and Double Conclusion
Chapters 17 to 21 contain the "Double Conclusion" of the Book of Judges and form a type of  inclusio together with their counterpart, the "Double Introduction", in chapters 1 to 3:6 as in the following structure of the whole book:
A. Foreign wars of subjugation with the ḥērem being applied (1:1–2:5)
B. Difficulties with foreign religious idols (2:6–3:6)
 Main part: the "cycles" section (3:7–16:31)
B'. Difficulties with domestic religious idols (17:1–18:31)
A'. Domestic wars with the ḥērem being applied (19:1–21:25)

There are similar parallels between the double introduction and the double conclusion as the following: 

 

The entire double conclusion is connected by the four-time repetition of a unique statement: twice in full at the beginning and the end of the double conclusion and twice in the center of the section as follows:

 A. In those days there was no king…
Every man did what right in his own eyes (17:6)
B. In those days there was no king… (18:1)
B'. In those days there was no king… (19:1)
 A'. In those days there was no king…
Every man did what right in his own eyes (21:25)

It also contains internal links:
Conclusion 1 (17:1–18:31): A Levite in Judah moving to the hill country of Ephraim and then on to Dan.
Conclusion 2 (19:1–21:25): A Levite in Ephraim looking for his concubine in Bethlehem in Judah.
Both sections end with a reference to Shiloh.

The Bethlehem Trilogy
Three sections of the Hebrew Bible (Old Testament) — Judges 17–18, Judges 19–21, Ruth 1–4 — form a trilogy with a link to the city Bethlehem of Judah and characterized by the repetitive unique statement:
"In those days there was no king in Israel; everyone did what was right in his own eyes"
(Judges 17:6; 18:1; 19:1; 21:25; cf. Ruth 1:1)
as in the following chart:

Chapters 19 to 21
The section comprising Judges 19:1-21:25 has a chiastic structure of five episodes as follows:
A. The Rape of the Concubine (19:1–30)
B. ḥērem ("holy war") of Benjamin (20:1–48)
C. Problem: The Oaths-Benjamin Threatened with Extinction (21:1–5)
B'. ḥērem ("holy war") of Jabesh Gilead (21:6–14)
A'. The Rape of the Daughters of Shiloh (21:15–25)

In particular, chapter 21 records how the Benjaminites were reintegrated into the pan-Israelite community, after they were nearly wiped out in the civil war except for the 600 men who hid in the Rock of Rimmon (last chapter). Paradoxically, the process requires another massacre against fellow Israelites and another violence of women. The rape of the daughters of Shiloh is the ironic counterpoint to the rape of the Levite's concubine, with the "daughter" motif linking the two stories ( and Judges 21:21), and the women becoming 'doorways leading into and out of war, sources of contention and reconciliation'. 

The structure of chapter 21 is as follows:
The problem (21:1–4)
An apparent solution (21:5–12)
A further problem (21:13–18)
The final outcome (21:19–24)
Closing refrain (21:25)

A new problem and an apparent solution (21:1–14)
The war had just ended when a fresh complication appeared because the Israelites made an ill-considered oath in Mizpah (21:1; cf. 20:1) that they  would not voluntarily give their daughter to the Benjaminites. During the war all the Benjaminite women have been slaughtered (20:47-48;
21:16) and because of the oath the six hundred male survivors must die childless, raising an obstacle to restore the brotherhood (21:6; cf. 20:23, 28). When the people's call to YHWH went unanswered (after they tried to put the blame on YHWH;21:3), they took actions that led to an added excessive slaughter. A search indicates that the inhabitants of Jabesh-gilead did not join the Israelites at Mizpah and the war, so hērem (holy war or "ban") was applied to that city, but with a purpose to capture their virgin women while killing the rest of the people (cf. Numbers 31), to supply brides for the surviving Benjaminites. However, only 400 virgins were available, thus not enough for the 600 men of Benjamin (verses 12, 14).

Verse 3
And they said,
"O LORD, the God of Israel,
why has this happened in Israel,
that today there should be one tribe lacking in Israel?"
The threefold reference to "Israel" after calling YHWH ("") indicates an 'oblique form of protest' to imply that this situation was God's responsibility, but God would not be drawn into it, so God remained silent.

The rape of the daughters of Shiloh (21:15–25)

When the earlier solution did not adequately solve the problem (200 Benjaminite men were still without brides), another morally questionable plan was hatched. Still affected with the curse of the oath they have placed for whoever willingly help Benjamin as a tribe to survive (verse 18), the Israelites provided  the Benjaminites an opportunity to 'engage in wife-stealing' of the young Israel virgins during their annual pilgrimage to Shiloh, linked to the story of Jephthah's daughter (Judges 11).

Verse 21
and watch; and just when the daughters of Shiloh come out to perform their dances, then come out from the vineyards, and every man catch a wife for himself from the daughters of Shiloh; then go to the land of Benjamin.
"To perform their dances": from Hebrew ,  ba-, "to dance in dances" (KJV).

Verse 25
In those days there was no king in Israel: every man did that which was right in his own eyes.
This final occurrence of the refrain links the two parts of the coda (chapters 17–18 and 19–21) together. It could be seen as the final verdict of the book that the institution of judges is politically unsatisfactory, thus points forward to the Books of Samuel in which Samuel, as the last judge, anoints Saul to become the first king of Israel.

See also

Related Bible parts: Judges 3, Judges 19, Judges 20

Notes

References

Sources

External links
 Jewish translations:
 Shoftim - Judges - Chapter 21 (Judaica Press). Hebrew text and English translation [with Rashi's commentary] at Chabad.org
 Christian translations:
 Online Bible at GospelHall.org (ESV, KJV, Darby, American Standard Version, Bible in Basic English)
 Judges chapter 21. Bible Gateway

21